The 1907 Grand National was the 69th renewal of the renewal of the Grand National horse race that took place at Aintree Racecourse near Liverpool, England, on 22 March 1907.

The race was won by Eremon, an 8/1 bet ridden by jockey Alf Newey and trained by Tom Coulthwaite.

Tom West finished in second place, Patlander was third and Ravenscliffe fourth.

Twenty-three horses ran and all but one returned safely to the stables. Kilts was fatally injured in a fall at the first fence.

Finishing Order

Non-finishers

References

 1907
Grand National
Grand National
20th century in Lancashire